Joe Quigg is a retired American basketball player.  He was a key player on the 1957 National Champion North Carolina Tar Heels and a second round draft pick by the New York Knicks in 1958.

Quigg stood 6 feet 9 inches tall and played the center position at St. Francis Prep in New York City. He came to the University of North Carolina through coach Frank McGuire's "underground railroad" of players from New York to Chapel Hill along with the likes of Pete Brennan, Tommy Kearns and Lennie Rosenbluth.

Quigg was a two-year starter; for the 1955–56 and 1956–57 seasons.  Quigg averaged 12.0 points and 9.0 rebounds per game as a sophomore, then 10.3 points and 8.6 rebounds per game as a junior.  The Tar Heels went undefeated in his junior season and won the national championship.  Quigg was instrumental in the championship game win, one of  the greatest games in history. Quigg made the game-winning free throws and knocked down a pass to 7 feet 1 inch tall Kansas center Wilt Chamberlain in the closing seconds of the 54–53, triple-overtime win.

Quigg was primed for a strong senior year in 1957–58, as the Tar Heels returned a strong nucleus from their championship team.  However, he was injured in a preseason scrimmage and was out the entire season with a broken leg.

Even after missing his entire senior season, the New York Knicks spent a second round pick (#11 overall) on Quigg in the 1958 NBA Draft.  Not fully healed, Quigg did not make the team.  Instead, Joe Quigg went to dental school and became a dentist.

References

Date of birth unknown
Living people
Basketball players from New York City
Centers (basketball)
New York Knicks draft picks
North Carolina Tar Heels men's basketball players
Sportspeople from Brooklyn
American men's basketball players
Year of birth missing (living people)